Metaxourgeio, also known as Metaxourghio on signage, is a station on Athens Metro Line 2. It opened in January 2000 as one of the 7 first stations of line 2. It is located west of Omonoia Square.

References

Athens Metro stations
Railway stations opened in 2000
2000 establishments in Greece